Parmacellidae is a family of air-breathing land slugs, terrestrial pulmonate gastropod mollusks within the superfamily Parmacelloidea (according to the taxonomy of the Gastropoda by Bouchet & Rocroi, 2005).

This family has no subfamilies (according to the taxonomy of the Gastropoda by Bouchet & Rocroi, 2005).

Slugs in this family make and use love darts made of chitin.

Distribution 
The distribution of the family Parmacellidae includes the western Palearctic, and ranges from the Canary Islands and Europe to Afghanistan.

Genera 
Genera within family Parmacellidae include:
 Candaharia Godwin-Austen, 1888
 subgenus Levanderiella Schileyko, 2007
 Cryptella Webb & Berthelot, 1833
 Parmacella Cuvier, 1804 - type genus

Cladogram 
The following cladogram shows the phylogenic relationship of this family with the other families in the limacoid clade:

References

Further reading 
 Schileyko A. A. (2003). "Treatise on recent terrestrial pulmonate mollusks. 10. Ariophantidae, Ostracolethaidae, Ryssotidae, Milacidae, Dyakiidae, Staffordiidae, Gastrodontidae, Zonitidae, Daudebardiidae, Parmacellidae". Ruthenica, Supplement 2. 1309–1466.

External links